SingStar is a series of music video games developed by London Studio and published by Sony Computer Entertainment for the PlayStation 2 and PlayStation 3 video game consoles. Gameplay in the SingStar games requires players to sing along to music in order to score points, using SingStar-specific USB microphones which ship with the game. Over 70 different SingStar SKUs have been released worldwide, featuring over 1,500 disc-based songs.

Editions of SingStar for the PlayStation 3 support downloadable content in the form of additional songs for the game. Almost all songs are able to be purchased individually, although some songs can only be purchased in themed packs of five. Over 1600 songs have been made available as downloadable content, including a total of 569 English-language songs. Songs are made available worldwide where possible, although regional differences exist due to licensing and censorship restrictions. The success of the SingStore exceeded the expectations of the game's developers, with over 2.2 million songs purchased from the online service as of August 2008.

Songpacks

References

External links 

SingStore catalogues:

 Australia
 Denmark
 Germany
 Spain
 Finland
 France
 Italy
 Norway
 Portugal
 Sweden
 United Kingdom
 United States

Lists of songs in music video games
Lists of video games by franchise
Lists of video game downloadable content
SingStar